Chovgan, Chowgan or Chogan (Persian: چوگان čōwgan), is a sporting team game with horses that originated in ancient Iran (Persia). It was considered an aristocratic game and held in a separate field, on specially trained horses. The game was widespread among the Asian peoples. It is played in Iran, Republic of Azerbaijan and among Tajiks and Uzbeks.

In 2013, chovqan in the Republic of Azerbaijan, was included in the UNESCO list of Intangible Cultural Heritage in need of urgent safeguarding

It was later adopted in the Western World, known today as polo.

History
Chovgan originated in ancient Iran (Persia) and was a Persian national sport played extensively by the nobility. Women played as well as men. Chovgan originated in the middle of the first millennium A.D., as a team game. It was very popular during the centuries in the Middle East. Fragments of the game were periodically portrayed in ancient miniatures, and also detailed descriptions and rules of the game were also given in the ancient manuscripts. Chogān is an Iranian traditional horse-riding game accompanied by music and storytelling; it has a history of over 2,000 years in Iran and has mostly been played in royal courts and urban fields.  Some authors give dates as early as the 5th century BC (or earlier) to the 1st century AD for its origin by the Medes. Certainly, the earliest records of polo are Median (an ancient Iranian peoples).  During the period of the Parthian Empire (247 BC to 224 AD), the sport had great patronage under the kings and noblemen. According to The Oxford Dictionary of Late Antiquity, polo (known as čowgān in Middle Persian, i.e. chovgan), was a Persian ball game and an important pastime in the court of the Sasanian Empire (224–651). It was also part of royal education for the Sasanian ruling class. Emperor Shapur II learnt to play polo when he was seven years old in 316 AD. Known as chovgan it is still played in the region today.

Englishmen had a great role in distribution and development of the game in Europe and the whole world. So chovgan – brought from India to England in the 19th century became more popular and addition of new rules into it favored quick spreading of this game in Europe and the USA. Namely on the initiative of Englishmen this game acquired its present name – polo and was included into program of the Olympic Games held in 1900, in Paris. 5 teams from three countries took part in the contests.

Chovgan in Iran
Chovgan, known as chowkan in the Sasanian Empire (Middle Persian: čowkān), was part of royal education for the Sasanian ruling class. The neighboring Eastern Romans adopted chovgan from the Sasanians and called it tzykanion, which derives from the Middle Persian word. During the reign of Theodosius II, the Roman imperial court started playing tzykanion in the tzykanisterion (polo stadium). By the time of the Tang dynasty (618–907), records of polo were well-established in China. According to The Oxford Dictionary of Late Antiquity, the popularity of polo in Tang China was "bolstered, no doubt, by the presence of the Sasanian court in exile".

Polo was at first a training game for cavalry units, usually the king's guard or other elite troops. In time polo became an Iranian national sport played normally by the nobility. Women as well as men played the game, as indicated by references to the queen and her ladies engaging King Khosrow II Parviz and his courtiers in the 6th century AD. Certainly Persian literature and art give us the richest accounts of polo in antiquity. Ferdowsi, the famed Iranian poet-historian, gives a number of accounts of royal chogan tournaments in his 9th century epic, Shahnameh (the Book of Kings). In the earliest account, Ferdowsi romanticizes an international match between Turanian force and the followers of Siyâvash, a legendary Iranian prince from the earliest centuries of the Empire; the poet is eloquent in his praise of Siyâvash's skills on the polo field. Ferdowsi also tells of Emperor Shapur II of the Sasanian dynasty of the 4th century who learned to play polo when he was only seven years old. Naqsh-i Jahan Square in Isfahan is in fact a polo field which was built by king Abbas I in the 17th century.

Sultan Qutb al-Din Aibak, the Turkic military slave from present-day Northern Afghanistan who then became Emperor of North India, ruled as an emperor for only four years, from 1206 to 1210 but died accidentally in 1210 playing polo. While he was playing a game of polo on horseback, his horse fell and Aibak was impaled on the pommel of his saddle. He was buried near the Anarkali bazaar in Lahore (which is now in Pakistan). Aibak's son Aram, died in 1211 CE [2], so Shams-ud-din Iltutmish, another military slave of Turkic ancestry who was married to Aibak's daughter, succeeded him as Sultan of Delhi.

From Persia, polo spread to the Byzantines (who called it tzykanion), and after the Muslim conquests to the Ayyubid and Mameluke dynasties of Egypt and the Levant, whose elites favoured it above all other sports. Notable sultans such as Saladin and Baybars were known to play it and encourage it in their court. Polo sticks were features on the Mameluke precursor to modern day playing cards.

Later on Polo was passed from Persia to other parts of Asia including the Indian subcontinent and China, where it was very popular during the Tang Dynasty and frequently depicted in paintings and statues. Valuable for training cavalry, the game was played from Constantinople to Japan by the Middle Ages. It is known in the East as the Game of Kings. The name polo is said to have been derived from the Tibetan word "pulu", meaning ball.
In 2017, Chogān in Islamic Republic of Iran was included in the UNESCO Cultural Heritage List.

Chovgan in Azerbaijan

In Azerbaijan, chovqan is considered a national sport. Various antique prints and ceramics suggest that the sport has a long history there. For example, a vessel with fragment pictures of a chovgan game was found during archaeological excavations in the Oran-Gala area, suggesting indirectly that the game existed during the 11th century around Beylagan city. Mentions of the chovgan game also appear in “Khosrow and Shirin”, a poem by the Persian poet and thinker Nizami Ganjavi, and in pages of the Turkic classic epic “Kitabi Dede Korkut”.

One of varieties of this game was broadly cultivated in Azerbaijan. Here two teams strive for scoring a goal with special clubs. Rules in the modern edition of the game are the following: two goals with a width of 3 meters with semi-circled areas with a radius of 6 meters are fixed in an enough big area. The game was held with a rubber or woven from leather belts ball. Clubs can be different in forms. In Azerbaijani horsemen they remind of shepherd's yarlyg. There are 6 riders in each team, 4 of whom act as attackers and two as fullbacks. The latter can play only on their half of the area. Goals can be scored behind the borders of penalty area. Duration of the game is 30 minutes in two periods.  Traditionally Karabakh horses are the mount of choice thanks to their combination of agility and relatively calm temperament.

In 1979, a documentary called “Chovgan game”, shot by Azerbaijan's Jafar Jabbarly film studio, recorded the sport's rules and historical development. However, overall the Soviet era saw a decline of the sport to near 'oblivion' and the dislocations of the immediate post-Soviet period proved difficult for the breeding of horses. In recent years, however, the sport has rebounded somewhat. Since 2006, Azerbaijan holds a national tournament in December known as the President's Cup at the Republican Equestrian Tourism Center, at Dashyuz near Shaki. The first of these, held from December 22 to 25 2006, pitted teams from eight cities of Azerbaijan – Shaki, Aghdam, Ağstafa, Balakən, Qakh, Gazakh, Oğuz and Zagatala with those from Aghstafa taking overall victory.

In 2013, chovqan in the Republic of Azerbaijan, was included in the UNESCO list of Intangible Cultural Heritage in need of urgent safeguarding

See also
 Polo

References

External links
 

Sport in Iran
Sport in Azerbaijan
Sport in Uzbekistan
Polo
Masterpieces of the Oral and Intangible Heritage of Humanity
Sports originating in Iran
Iranian inventions